Six ships of the Royal Navy have borne the name HMS Jaseur, the name coming from the French for the waxwing.

  was a 12-gun brig-sloop that  captured off the Andaman Islands in 1807. She foundered, with the loss of her whole crew, in 1808.
  was a  brig-sloop launched in 1813 and sold in 1847.
  was a wood screw gunboat launched in 1857 and wrecked in 1859.
  was a  wood screw gunvessel launched in 1862 and sold in 1874 to the Commissioners of Irish Lights. Whether they renamed her and how long they kept her is unclear.
  was a torpedo gunboat launched in 1892 and sold in 1905.
  was an  launched in 1944 and sold for breaking up in 1956.

Citations and references
Citations

References

Royal Navy ship names